2430 Bruce Helin is a stony Phocaea asteroid and slow rotator from the inner regions of the asteroid belt. It was discovered by American astronomers Eleanor Helin and Eugene Shoemaker at the U.S. Palomar Observatory in California, on 8 November 1977. It was later named after Bruce Helin, son of the first discoverer.

Orbit and classification 

Bruce Helin is a member of the Phocaea family. It orbits the Sun in the inner main-belt at a distance of 1.9–2.9 AU once every 3 years and 8 months (1,326 days). Its orbit has an eccentricity of 0.21 and an inclination of 23° with respect to the ecliptic. The body's observation arc begins with a precovery taken at Crimea–Nauchnij in 1976, or one year prior to its official discovery observation at Palomar.

Naming 

This minor planet was named after Bruce Helin, son of the first discover Eleanor Helin, in an expression of gratitude for "the many years he tolerated his mother's preoccupation with extraterrestrial objects". The discoverer has also honoured her daughter-in-law and wife of Bruce, Nancy Coker Helin, by the minor planet 4222 Nancita. The official  was published by the Minor Planet Center on 13 October 1981.

Physical characteristics 

In the Tholen classification, Bruce Helin is a common, stony S-type asteroid, while in the Bus–Binzel SMASS taxonomy, it is an Sl-subtype, which transitions from the S-type to the uncommon L-type asteroid.

Rotation period 

The first rotational lightcurve of Bruce Helin was obtained from photometric observations by Czech astronomer Petr Pravec in September 2006. The lightcurve showed a rotation period of  hours with a brightness variation of 0.60 in magnitude. Later observations rendered a similar rotation period of 129.75 and  hours, respectively.

Diameter and albedo 

According to the surveys carried out by the Japanese Akari satellite and NASA's Wide-field Infrared Survey Explorer with its NEOWISE mission, Bruce Helin measures 11.8 and 12.5 kilometers in diameter, and its surface has an albedo of 0.18 and 0.24, respectively. The Collaborative Asteroid Lightcurve Link (CALL) assumes an albedo of 0.23 and calculates a diameter of 12.1 kilometers with an absolute magnitude of 11.8.

Notes

References

External links 
 Lightcurve Database Query (LCDB), at www.minorplanet.info
 Dictionary of Minor Planet Names, Google books
 Asteroids and comets rotation curves, CdR – Geneva Observatory, Raoul Behrend
 Discovery Circumstances: Numbered Minor Planets (1)-(5000) – Minor Planet Center
 
 

002430
Discoveries by Eleanor F. Helin
Discoveries by Eugene Merle Shoemaker
Named minor planets
002430
002430
002430
19771108